7th SDFCS Awards 
December 20, 2002

Best Film: 
 Far from Heaven 
The 7th San Diego Film Critics Society Awards, given by the San Diego Film Critics Society on 20 December 2002, honored the best in film for 2002.

Winners
Best Actor: 
Daniel Day-Lewis - Gangs of New York
Best Actress: 
Julianne Moore - Far from Heaven
Best Cinematography: 
Road to Perdition - Conrad L. Hall
Best Director: 
Jill Sprecher - Thirteen Conversations About One Thing
Best Editing: 
Thirteen Conversations About One Thing - Stephen Mirrione
Best Film: 
Far from Heaven
Best Foreign Language Film:
Talk to Her (Hable con ella) • Spain
Best Production Design: 
Minority Report - Alex McDowell
Best Screenplay - Adapted: 
Adaptation. - Charlie and Donald Kaufman
Best Screenplay - Original: 
Thirteen Conversations About One Thing - Jill Sprecher and Karen Sprecher
Best Supporting Actor: 
Chris Cooper - Adaptation.
Best Supporting Actress: 
Michelle Pfeiffer - White Oleander
Body of Work Award: 
Isabelle Huppert - The Piano Teacher, Les destinées sentimentales (a.k.a. Les Destinées), Merci pour le chocolat (a.k.a. Nightcap) and 8 Women

2
2002 film awards
2002 in American cinema